Adelbert Delos Thorp (April 15, 1844February 10, 1919) was an American farmer, fisherman, and Wisconsin pioneer.  He was a member of the Wisconsin State Assembly, representing Door County in the 1882 session, and later served as sergeant-at-arms of the Wisconsin Senate.  In historical documents, his first name is sometimes given as "Albert", and his middle name is sometimes spelled "Deloss".

Biography
Adelbert D. Thorp was born in Oswego, New York on April 15, 1844.  He came to the Wisconsin Territory with his family as a child in 1846, and settled at Rubicon, in Dodge County, where he was raised and educated.  They moved to Monroe County, Wisconsin, in 1860.

At the outbreak of the American Civil War, Thorp volunteered for service with the Union Army.  He was enrolled as a private in Company A of the 3rd Wisconsin Infantry Regiment.  He served nearly two years with the regiment before being discharged in March 1863 due to disability.  He re-enlisted in the Fall of 1864 and was assigned to Company K of the 43rd Wisconsin Infantry Regiment, where he was promoted to first sergeant.  He mustered out with the 43rd Wisconsin Infantry in June 1865.

After the war, Thorp returned to Monroe County, where he was married in 1869.  In 1871, he moved to Egg Harbor, in Door County, where he remained for most of the rest of his life.  At Egg Harbor, Thorp became involved in the fishing business and was elected town chairman, serving two one-year terms.  He was then elected county clerk in 1876 and re-elected in 1878.

In 1881, he was elected to the Wisconsin State Assembly, running on the Republican Party ticket.  He served in the 35th Wisconsin Legislature and was a member of the committee on incorporations.  He did not run for re-election in 1882.  However, at the start of the 1883 session of the Legislature, the Wisconsin Senate elected him to serve as their sergeant-at-arms.  He continued as an employee of the Senate in the 1885 session, working as proofreader.

In 1887, Thorp was appointed sheriff of Door County by Governor Jeremiah McLain Rusk, following the death of the incumbent, Thomas Scott.  Thorp served the remainder of Scott's term, and was later elected to another term in 1892.  In 1894, he ran instead for county treasurer and served one term in that office.

In 1897, Thorp was appointed special agent for the U.S. Land Office in Spokane, Washington.  He served there for eight years before retiring due to poor health.

Thorp died in February 1919 at the home of his daughter in Sturgeon Bay, Wisconsin, after a long illness.

Personal life and family
Thorp married Ellen Augusta Durkee in on March 2, 1869, at Tomah, Wisconsin.  They had at least four children together before her death in 1893.

Electoral history

Wisconsin Assembly (1881)

| colspan="6" style="text-align:center;background-color: #e9e9e9;"| General Election, November 8, 1881

References

1844 births
1919 deaths
Politicians from Oswego, New York
People from Monroe County, Wisconsin
People from Door County, Wisconsin
People of Wisconsin in the American Civil War
Union Army soldiers
Republican Party members of the Wisconsin State Assembly
Employees of the Wisconsin Legislature
County clerks in Wisconsin
Wisconsin sheriffs
County treasurers in Wisconsin